11th New York Film Critics Circle Awards
January 20, 1946(announced January 1, 1946)

The Lost Weekend
The 11th New York Film Critics Circle Awards, announced on 1 January 1946, honored the best filmmaking of 1945.

Winners
Best Film:
The Lost Weekend
Best Actor:
Ray Milland - The Lost Weekend
Best Actress:
Ingrid Bergman - Spellbound and The Bells of St. Mary's
Best Director:
Billy Wilder - The Lost Weekend
Special Awards:
The Fighting Lady
The True Glory

References

External links
1945 Awards

1945
New York Film Critics Circle Awards, 1945
1945 in American cinema
1945 in New York City